Daniel, Danny or Dan Campbell may refer to:

 Daniel Campbell (died 1753) (1671/2–1753), Scottish merchant and politician
 Daniel Campbell (Australian politician) (1812–1875), politician in Electoral district of Richmond, Australia
 Daniel Campbell (Canadian politician) (1926–1992), Canadian politician
 Daniel Campbell (constable), special constable of the Dominion Police who shot Albert "Ginger" Goodwin dead
 Daniel Campbell (Medal of Honor) (1874–1955), American Spanish–American War Medal of Honor recipient
 Dan Campbell (born 1976), American football player
 Dan Campbell (singer) (born 1986), lead vocalist for American punk band The Wonder Years
 Danny Campbell (footballer, born 1944) (1944–2020), English player (West Bromwich Albion, Stockport County), in 1966 Football League Cup Final
 Danny Campbell (rugby league) (born 1956), New Zealand rugby league player with Wigan